The Série 0350 are a type of single carriage diesel railcar used by Portuguese Railways (CP). They were built by Allan of Rotterdam in the Netherlands in 1954-55 (as Série 0300). In 2000 they were extensively modernised and reclassified as Série 0350. The distinctive roof pod above the driver's compartment houses heat dissipators for rheostatic braking.

Many of the lines used by these units have been closed in recent years, notably the Figueira da Foz and Lousã branches. In August 2017 CP restarted a one-per-day return passenger service on the Linha do Leste between Entroncamento and Badajoz (Spain) using a 0350 railcar.

Allan also built a metre gauge version of its diesel railcars for CP, which were classified Série 9300.

See also
 Automotora VIP

References

External links 
 Trainlogistic

Diesel multiple units of Portugal